Bar-B-Que Movie is an 11-minute Super 8 film directed by American actor/filmmaker Alex Winter, created in 1988. It is a spoof of 1974's The Texas Chain Saw Massacre, and stars American punk band Butthole Surfers. Featured Surfers include Gibby Haynes, Paul Leary, King Coffey, Teresa Nervosa, and Jeff Pinkus, as well as the band's dancer, Kathleen Lynch.

Premise
In this Twisted spoof of The Texas Chainsaw Massacre, a vacationing family (the father of which, Jerry, is played by actor John Hawkes, of later Deadwood fame) is waylaid by a communal group of cannibalistic misfits, played by the Butthole Surfers. The mother and Jerry are tricked into consuming hallucinogenic beverages, while their son, Jerry Jr., is murdered. A short time later, Jerry Jr.'s meat is served as dinner.

After eating, Jerry runs off to find his son, but instead finds the Butthole Surfers, who are doing a live performance of the song "Fast" (a.k.a. "Fart Song"). Though staged, the segment presents a fairly accurate reproduction of the band's then-legendary live concerts.  The movie also contains excerpts from several other Butthole Surfers songs: "Concubine", "Weber" "Graveyard" and a different version of "Fast". The movie ends with Jerry waking up in a fenced area along with his wife - she tells him to eat his breakfast, which is the remains of Jerry Jr.

Cast
 John Hawkes as Jerry
 King Coffey as himself
 Gibby Haynes as himself
 Paul Leary as himself
 Kathleen Lynch as herself
 Jeff Pinkus as himself
 Teresa Taylor as herself
 Randy Turner as Drunk Homeless Guy
 Alex Winter as Mexican Hitchhiker

References

External links

1988 films
American short films
Butthole Surfers
Films about cannibalism
1980s English-language films